Families of the Mafia is an American reality television series that premiered on MTV on April 9, 2020 in the United States. The show is a retooling of the short lived Made in Staten Island. Its predecessor focused on the lives of seven young adults living in Staten Island trying to avoid the influence of local organized crime. In March 2020, fourteen months after its sudden cancellation, MTV announced they had continued to work with five of the seven young adults and the producers. The focus shifted on the lives of the families, all connected in some way to not only one another, but the mafia and other mobs.

A second season premiered on July 15, 2021.

Cast
The Gravanos
Karen Gravano
Karina Seabrook
Sammy "The Bull" Gravano
Ramona Rizzo (season 1)
The O'Tooles
Joe O'Toole
Taylor O'Toole
Jessica Clare
Matt O'Toole (season 2)
Billy O'Toole † (season 1)
The LaRoccas
Gina LaRocca
Christian "CP" Patterson Jr. 
Trish Gelardi
Anthony Gelardi
Christian "Chris" Patterson Sr. †  (season 2)
The Nayfelds (season 2)
Eli Kiperman
Boris Nayfeld
Angela Kiperman Nayfeld
The Cutolos (season 2)
Billy Cutolo Jr.
Nahla Cutolo
Billy "Bills" Cutolo III
Layla Cutolo
Nicco Cutolo
The Augustines (season 1)
Lisa Augustine
Dennie Augustine

Episodes

Series Overview

Season 1 (2020)

Season 2 (2021)

References

External links 
 
 

MTV reality television series
2020s American reality television series
2020 American television series debuts
Television series about families